After Sundown may refer to:

 After Sundown (1911 film), an Australian film
 After Sundown (2006 film), an American film